Moodna ostrinella, the darker moodna moth, is a species of snout moth in the genus Moodna. It was described by James Brackenridge Clemens in 1860, and is known from North America, including Alabama, Florida, Illinois, Maine, Maryland, Massachusetts, Michigan, Minnesota, New Brunswick, New Jersey, New York, Ohio, Oklahoma, Ontario, Pennsylvania, Quebec, South Carolina, Tennessee, Texas and West Virginia.

References

Moths described in 1860
Phycitinae